Éléonore Goldberg is a French-Canadian writer and artist based in Quebec. She is most noted for her 2019 novel Maison fauve, which was a shortlisted finalist for the Governor General's Award for French-language fiction at the 2019 Governor General's Awards, and her 2020 animated short film Hibiscus Season (La saison des hibiscus), which won the Prix Iris for Best Animated Film at the 22nd Quebec Cinema Awards in 2021.

Born in France, Goldberg spent part of her childhood living in Zaire with her family.

References

21st-century Canadian artists
21st-century Canadian novelists
21st-century Canadian women writers
21st-century French artists
21st-century French novelists
21st-century French women writers
Canadian animators
Canadian women animators
Canadian women artists
Canadian women novelists
Canadian novelists in French
French animators
French women animators
French women artists
French women novelists
French emigrants to Canada
Artists from Quebec
Writers from Quebec
Living people
Year of birth missing (living people)